The 1975 Commercial Union Assurance Masters  was a men's tennis tournament played on indoor carpet courts at the Kungliga tennishallen in Stockholm, Sweden. The tournament was the season ending event of the 1975 Commercial Union Assurance Grand Prix circuit and was played by the eight highest ranking singles players and the four highest ranked doubles teams. It was the 6th edition of the Masters Grand Prix and was held from November 30 through December 7, 1975. Ilie Năstase won the singles title and the $40,000 first prize.

Finals

Singles

 Ilie Năstase defeated  Björn Borg 6–2, 6–2, 6–1
 It was Năstase's 9th title of the year and the 77th of his career.

Doubles

 Juan Gisbert, Sr. /  Manuel Orantes won a round robin competition.
 It was Gisbert, Sr's 9th title of the year and the 20th of his career. It was Orantes' 14th title of the year and the 39th of his career.

References

 
Grand Prix tennis circuit year-end championships
Tennis tournaments in Sweden
Commercial Union Assurance Masters, 1975
Commercial Union Assurance Masters, 1975
Commercial Union Assurance Masters, 1975